Dibolia cynoglossi is a species of leaf beetle (Chrysomelidae family) that can be found nearly everywhere in Europe.

References

Beetles described in 1803
Alticini
Beetles of Europe
Taxa named by Wilhelm Daniel Joseph Koch